Broken UFO is the fourth album by Australian rock band Icecream Hands. It was released in August 2002. 

A single, "Rain Hail Shine", was nominated for the ARIA Award for Best Independent Release at the ARIA Music Awards of 2002.

Track listing
(All songs by Charles Jenkins except where noted)
 "Broken UFO" — 3:05
 "Coming After You Again" — 4:42
 "Beautiful Fields" — 3:15
 "Head Down" (Marcus Goodwin) — 3:33
 "Stay in the Same Room" — 3:35
 "The Diplomat's Daughter"  — 4:00
 "Why'd You Have to Leave Me This Way" — 3:27
 "When the Show is Over" (Douglas Lee Robertson) — 4:05
 "Because You're Young" — 4:02
 "Come Down Come Down" — 3:11
 "Rain Hail Shine" — 3:44
 "Waterproof" — 3:51
 "Leaving All the Best" — 4:08
 "Happy in the Sky" (Robertson) — 4:11

Personnel

 Marcus Goodwin — guitar
 Charles Jenkins — guitar, vocals
 Douglas Lee Robertson — bass, vocals
 Derek G. Smiley — drums, vocals

Additional personnel

 Garrett Costigan — pedal steel
 Ian Whitehurst — saxophones
 Eugene Ball — trumpet
 Stephanie Lindner — violin
 Caerwen Martin — cello
 Shane O'Mara — guitar
 Rebecca Barnard — backing vocals
 Matthew Vehl — hammond organ

Charts

References

2002 albums